

em

ema-emi
Emadine (Alcon)
emakalim (INN)
Embeline
Embolex
embramine (INN)
embusartan (INN)
embutramide (INN)
Emcyt
Emcyt (Pharmacia & Upjohn Company)
emedastine (INN)
Emend
emepepimut-S (USAN)
emepronium bromide (INN)
Emete-Con
emfilermin (INN)
Emgel
emicerfont (USAN, INN)
emideltide (INN)
emiglitate (INN)
emilium tosilate (INN)
emitefur (INN)

eml-emy
Emla
emoctakin (INN)
emopamil (INN)
emorfazone (INN)
Empracet (Glaxo Wellcome)
emricasan (USAN, INN)
Emtriva
emylcamate (INN)

en

ena-enc
enadoline (INN)
enahexal (Hexal Australia) [Au]. Redirects to enalapril.
enalapril (INN)
enalaprilat
enalaprilat (INN)
enalkiren (INN)
enazadrem (INN)
Enbrel (Amgen)
enbucrilate (INN)
encainide (INN)
enciprazine (INN)
enclomifene (INN)
encyprate (INN)

end-enj
Endep
endixaprine (INN)
endomide (INN)
endomycin (INN)
Endosol Extra
endralazine (INN)
Endrate
endrisone (INN)
Enduron
Enduronyl
enefexine (INN)
enestebol (INN)
enfenamic acid (INN)
enfilcon A (USAN)
enflurane (INN)
enfuvirtide (USAN)
englitazone (INN)
eniclobrate (INN)
enilconazole (INN)
enilospirone (INN)
eniluracil (INN)
enisamium iodide (INN)
enisoprost (INN)
Enjuvia

enl-enr
enlimomab pegol (INN)
Enlon-Plus
Enlon
enloplatin (INN)
enocitabine (INN)
enofelast (INN)
enolicam (INN)
Enovid
enoxacin (INN)
enoxamast (INN)
enoxaparin sodium (INN)
enoximone (INN)
enoxolone (INN)
enpiprazole (INN)
enpiroline (INN)
enprazepine (INN)
Enpresse
enprofylline (INN)
enpromate (INN)
enprostil (INN)
enramycin (INN)
enrofloxacin (INN)

ens-env
ensaculin (INN)
ensituximab (USAN)
entacapone (INN)
entecavir (INN)
entinostat (INN)
Entocort EC
entsufon (INN)
Enulose
enviomycin (INN)
enviradene (INN)
enviroxime (INN)
enzastaurin (USAN)

ep

epa-epe
epafipase (INN)
epalrestat (INN)
epanolol (INN)
epelestat (INN)
eperezolid (INN)
eperisone (INN)
epervudine (INN)
epetirimod (USAN, INN)

epi-epl
Epi E Z Pen Jr
epicainide (INN)
epicillin eta (INN)
Epicort
epicriptine (INN)
epiestriol (INN)
Epifoam
epimestrol (INN)
epinastine (INN)
epinephrine (INN)
EpiPen (Mylan)
epipropidine (INN)
epirizole (INN)
epiroprim (INN)
epirubicin (INN)
eptifibatide (INN)
epitiostanol (INN)
epitizide (INN)
Epitol
epitumomab cituxetan (INN)
Epivir (GlaxoSmithKline)
eplerenone (INN)
eplivanserin (USAN)

epo-ept
epoetin alfa (INN)
epoetin beta (INN)
epoetin gamma (INN)
epoetin delta (USAN)
epoetin epsilon (INN)
epoetin zeta (INN)
epoetin theta (INN)
epoetin iota (INN)
epoetin kappa (INN)
epoetin omega (INN)
Epogen (Amgen)
epoprostenol (INN)
epostane (INN)
eprazinone (INN)
epratuzumab (INN)
eprinomectin (INN)
epristeride (INN)
eprobemide (INN)
eprodisate (USAN, INN)
eprosartan (INN)
eprotirome (INN)
eprovafen (INN)
eproxindine (INN)
eprozinol (INN)
epsiprantel (INN)
eptacog alfa (activated) (INN)
eptaloprost (INN)
eptastigmine (INN)
eptazocine (INN)
eptifibatide (INN)
eptotermin alfa (INN)